Klotz may refer to:

Klotz (surname) (including a list of people with the name)
 Klotz, a fictional place in Überwald in Discworld, a fantasy book series
 10222 Klotz, an asteroid; see List of asteroids/10001–11000 
 Klotz (violin makers), Bavarian family of violin makers since the mid-17th century
 Klotz Digital, a German multinational manufacturer of commercial audio systems

See also 
 Cloots
 Kloc (disambiguation)